Edward Selzer (January 12, 1893 – February 22, 1970) was an American film producer and publicist who served as head of Warner Bros. Cartoons from 1944 to 1958. He served in the US Navy and fought as a Golden Gloves boxer. He won a boxing exhibition for the Navy and was awarded with a weekend pass. While out on leave he met a New York chorus girl named Laura Cohn; he later married Laura in 1927 and relocated to Los Angeles where they had two children; Phyllis and Robert.

Career at Warner Bros. 
In 1930, Lewis Warner persuaded Selzer to join Warner Bros. to work on Robert Ripley's "Believe it or Not" series and to start an animation unit. Due to The Great Depression, he had no other choice but to take the job. He was also on an around-the-world tour with Ripley on Believe it or Not. In late 1933 he was named Director of Publicity at Warners and from 1937 to 1944, he served as the head of the trailer and title departments. 

After the studio was purchased from Leon Schlesinger by Warner Bros. in July 1944, Selzer was assigned studio head by Jack L. Warner. His first cartoon was Goldilocks and the Jivin' Bears.

Unlike his predecessor, Selzer did not want any on-screen credit as producer for Warner Bros. Much of what is publicly known about Selzer's personality and business acumen is from Chuck Jones' autobiography, Chuck Amuck: The Life and Times of an Animated Cartoonist. In it, Jones paints Selzer as an interfering (and hypocritical) bore with no gratefulness towards the cartoons’ animators. They later developed a mutual respect and understanding of one another, remaining friendly until Selzer's passing. 

Friz Freleng nearly resigned after butting heads with Selzer, who did not think that pairing Sylvester the cat and Tweety was a viable decision. The argument reached its crux when Freleng reportedly placed his drawing pencil on Selzer's desk, angrily telling Selzer that if he knew so much about animation, he should do the work himself instead. Selzer backed off the issue and apologized to Freleng that evening. Tweetie Pie, the very cartoon that first paired Sylvester and Tweety together, went on to win Warner Brothers' first Academy Award for Animated Short Film, in 1947, with Tweety and Sylvester proving to be among the most endearing duos in Warner Bros. cartoons. Accepting the Short Subject (Cartoon) award for Tweetie Pie from Shirley Temple at the 20th Academy Awards ceremony on March 20, 1948, Selzer said:In accepting this award, I'm naturally thrilled, but I accept it for the entire Warner Bros. Cartoon Studio. It might interest you to know that in production of this "Tweetie Pie," 85 percent of our personnel were directly connected with its construction. However, the one man who really should be up here getting this award and not me, is the director of the picture, Friz Freleng, who is in the audience. I can't pay him too great a tribute. Thank you.

Selzer also forbade Robert McKimson from producing any future cartoons with the Tasmanian Devil in them after seeing the Devil's premiere short and deeming the creature far too grotesque to be a recurring character. Selzer changed his mind and allowed further Tasmanian Devil cartoons only upon discovering from Jack Warner that Taz was in fact a massive hit with audiences.

Selzer's edict that "camels aren't funny" inspired Friz Freleng to disprove him by making Sahara Hare, a cartoon in which much of the comedy arises from Yosemite Sam's attempts to control his dim-witted camel. Chuck Jones and Mike Maltese created Bully for Bugs in direct response to Selzer's declaration that there was nothing funny about bullfighting.

Edward Selzer was proud of his position as producer of the Looney Tunes series because of the joy the team's creations brought to so many. Although he loudly (and indelicately) declared that there was nothing funny about a skunk who spoke French, he proudly (yet hypocritically) accepted the Academy Award for Animated Short Film in 1949 – for For Scent-imental Reasons, a Pepé Le Pew cartoon.

Selzer retired in 1958, and John Burton became the head of Warner Bros. Cartoons.

Death 
Edward Selzer died on February 22, 1970, after a long illness. Upon his death, some of his five Academy Award Oscar statues for the winning cartoons he produced were distributed to the crews behind the cartoons; the one for 1957's Birds Anonymous were given to voice artist Mel Blanc while the ones for Tweetie Pie and Speedy Gonzales were given to Freleng.

References

External links 
 
 Toonopedia: Tasmanian Devil

1893 births
1970 deaths
American film producers
American animated film producers
American people of German descent
Warner Bros. Cartoons people
Film producers from New York (state)
Producers who won the Best Animated Short Academy Award